Luis Martínez (born 19 November 1966) is a Guatemalan long-distance runner. He competed in the men's marathon at the 1996 Summer Olympics.

References

1966 births
Living people
Athletes (track and field) at the 1996 Summer Olympics
Guatemalan male long-distance runners
Guatemalan male marathon runners
Olympic athletes of Guatemala
Athletes (track and field) at the 1995 Pan American Games
Pan American Games competitors for Guatemala
World Athletics Championships athletes for Guatemala
Place of birth missing (living people)
Central American Games gold medalists for Guatemala
Central American Games medalists in athletics
20th-century Guatemalan people
21st-century Guatemalan people